Robert White may refer to:

Entertainment
 Robert White (composer) (1538–1574), English composer
 Robert White (guitarist) (1936–1994), American Motown session guitarist
 Robert White (sculptor) (1921–2002), American sculptor
 Robert White (tenor) (born 1936), American tenor of Irish descent
 Rusty White (Robert L. White, born 1945), American founder of the Robb Report
 Robert White Johnson, American songwriter

Government and politics
 Robert White (ambassador) (1926–2015), U.S. ambassador
 Robert White (attorney general) (1833–1915), West Virginia Attorney General
 Robert White (Australian politician) (1838–1900), New South Wales politician
 Robert White (judge) (1759–1831), American military officer, lawyer, politician, and judge
 Robert White (mayor) (1914–2006), mayor of Papatoetoe, Auckland, New Zealand
 Robert White (Washington, D.C. politician) (born 1982), District of Columbia council member
 Robert White (West Virginia state senator) (1876–1935), American lawyer and politician
 Robert John White, Northern Ireland politician, mayor of Coleraine
 Robert Smeaton White (1856–1944), Canadian journalist and political figure
 Robert W. White (mayor) (1922–1985), mayor of Scarborough, Ontario, Canada

Medicine and science
 Robert White (Virginia physician) (1688–1752), Scottish-American physician and surgeon
 Robert J. White (1926–2010), American surgeon
 Robert M. White (meteorologist) (1923–2015), American meteorologist
 Robert W. White (psychologist) (1904–2001), American psychologist
 Bob White (geophysicist) (born 1952), English geophysicist

Sports
 Robert White (American football) (1912–1969), American college football coach
 Robert White (Australian footballer) (1895–1982), Australian rules footballer
 Robert White (baseball), American baseball player
 Robert White (cricketer) (born 1979), English cricketer and umpire
 Robert White (handballer) (born 1983), British handball player
 Robert White (sailor) (born 1956), British Olympic sailor
 Robert W. White (golfer) (1876–1959), Scottish-American golf course architect and golf administrator
 Robbie White (born 1995), English cricketer

Other
 Robert White (bishop) (died 1761), Primus of the Scottish Episcopal Church, 1747–1761
 Robert White (British Army officer) (1827–1902), British general
 Robert White (engraver) (1645–1703), English draughtsman and portrait engraver
 Robert White (priest), English Anglican priest
 Robert C. White (born 1953), chief of police of the Denver Police Department, Denver, Colorado
 Robert Meadows White (1798–1865), English cleric, professor of Anglo-Saxon at the University of Oxford
 Robert Michael White (1924–2010), United States Air Force veteran and test pilot
 Robert P. White (born 1963), United States Army general
 Bobby White (21st century), American police officer

See also
 Bert White (disambiguation)
 Bob White (disambiguation)
 Rob White (Formula One) (born 1965), English Formula One engineer
 Robert Wight (1796–1872), Scottish surgeon and botanist
 Robert Whyte (born 1955), Australian author, editor and journalist
 Robert Whyte (judge) (1787–1844), Justice of the Tennessee Supreme Court